Sophie Caroline of Brandenburg-Kulmbach (31 March 1705 – 7 June 1764) was a princess consort of Ostfriesland as the spouse of Prince George Albert of East Frisia (1690–1734).

Biography
She was a daughter of Christian Heinrich of Brandenburg-Bayreuth-Kulmbach and his wife, Sophie Christiane of Wolfstein. She was married in 1723 with Prince George Albert of East Frisia.

In 1734, she became a widow, and in 1735, she was invited to Denmark by king Christian VI of Denmark, who was married to her sister, Sophia Magdalen of Brandenburg-Kulmbach. She lived permanently at the Danish court after 1740 until her death. She was described as a charming beauty, and her sister, the queen, was said to be jealous of her: it was widely believed, that she and her brother-in-law the king had an affair, but this has never been confirmed. In 1766, these rumours led to a case were a woman, Anna Sophie Magdalene Frederikke Ulrikke, demanded a pension with the claim to be the daughter of Sophie Caroline and Christian.

Ancestry

References 

 Dansk biografisk Lexikon / XVI. Bind. Skarpenberg - Sveistrup (in Danish)

 

  

1705 births
1764 deaths
House of Hohenzollern
Princesses of East Frisia
House of Cirksena